The 1970 United States Senate election in New York was held on November 3, 1970, to elect New York's Class I Senator in its delegation. Representative Charles Goodell had been appointed by Governor Nelson Rockefeller to serve the remainder of Robert F. Kennedy's senatorial term, following Kennedy's assassination.

Goodell attempted to win election to a full term in the Senate with the Republican and Liberal nominations, but faced opposition from Democratic nominee Richard Ottinger and Conservative nominee James L. Buckley. Buckley was able to win with a plurality of the popular vote due to the left-wing vote being split between Ottinger and Goodell.

Buckley would serve in the Senate until his re-election bid was defeated by Daniel Patrick Moynihan in 1976. Buckley's victory in the 1970 election would remain the last time a third-party candidate won election to the Senate until Connecticut Senator Joe Lieberman won re-election with the Connecticut for Lieberman nomination in 2006, and the most recent occasion that a non-incumbent Senate candidate won on a third-party ballot line.

Background

It was speculated by the Democratic Party that Attorney General Robert F. Kennedy, the younger brother of President John F. Kennedy and older brother of Massachusetts Senator Ted Kennedy, would seek the Democratic nomination for New York's Senate election in 1964. Elected members of the Democratic Party supported a possible campaign by Robert Kennedy, with New York City Mayor Robert F. Wagner, Jr., endorsing him on August 21, 1964. On August 25, Kennedy announced that he would seek the Democratic Senatorial nomination, after establishing a residence in Glen Cove, New York.

On September 1, 1964, he defeated Representative Samuel S. Stratton for the Democratic nomination at the Democratic state convention, with 968 to 153 delegate votes. He also received the nomination of the Liberal Party, with a majority of the delegate vote. In the general election, he defeated incumbent Republican Senator Kenneth Keating.

Appointment

On March 16, 1968, Kennedy announced that he would seek the presidential nomination of the Democratic Party for the 1968 presidential election. After winning four primaries, Kennedy was assassinated by Sirhan Sirhan in Los Angeles, California, on June 6.

Kennedy's death left a vacancy in the United States Senate that would be filled through an appointment by Governor Nelson Rockefeller. John W. Gardner, John Lindsay, Burke Marshall, C. Douglas Dillon, Charles Goodell, Ogden Reid, and Whitney Young were considered as possible candidates for the appointment. On August 11, a spokesman for Rockfeller stated that the main choices for the appointment were Gardner, Goodell, and Reid. On September 10, Rockefeller appointed Goodell, a member of the House of Representatives from the 38th congressional district, to fill the vacancy.

On July 16, 1968, Joseph A. Valenti filed a lawsuit in the Western District Court against Governor Rockefeller, attempting to have a special election held during the 1968 election cycle, rather than the 1970 election cycle. Randolph Phillips and George Backer filed similar lawsuits in the Southern District Court on July 17, and July 19. On January 20, 1969, the Southern District Court dismissed their cases, allowing for Goodell to serve the remainder of Kennedy's term until a regular election was held in 1970.

Conservative nomination

On January 28, 1970, Kevin P. McGovern announced that he would seek the Conservative Party's senatorial nomination and criticized the party's leadership for allegedly favoring state Senator John J. Marchi. On April 6, James L. Buckley, the brother of conservative author William F. Buckley Jr. and the party's former senatorial nominee in 1968, announced that he would seek the Conservative Party's nomination.

The Conservative State Committee convened inside Hotel McAlpin in Manhattan, New York City, on April 7, to select the party's nominees in the general election. McGovern attempted to force a primary campaign between him and Buckley, but failed to receive the 25% of delegate votes to force a primary. Buckley received nearly ninety percent of the delegate votes and the remainder was split between McGovern and abstaining delegates.

Candidates
James L. Buckley, Conservative nominee in the 1968 Senate election and brother of William F. Buckley Jr.
Kevin P. McGovern, lawyer

Declined
William F. Buckley Jr., conservative author and Conservative nominee in the 1965 New York City mayoral election
John J. Marchi, member of the New York State Senate from the 23rd district

Results

Democratic nomination

Candidates
Richard D. McCarthy, U.S. Representative from Buffalo
Paul O'Dwyer, former member of the New York City Council and Democratic nominee in the 1968 Senate election
Richard Ottinger, U.S. Representative from Pleasantville
Ted Sorensen, 7th White House Counsel

Withdrew
Benjamin Stanley Rosenthal, U.S. Representative from Queens

Ineligible
Morris B. Abram, lawyer and former president of Brandeis University

Declined
Jonathan Brewster Bingham, U.S. Representative from the Bronx
Bill Moyers, 9th White House Press Secretary
Otis G. Pike, U.S. Representative from Riverhead
Howard J. Samuels, 8th Administrator of the Small Business Administration and Democratic lieutenant gubernatorial nominee in 1966
Samuel S. Stratton, U.S. Representative from Schenectady and candidate for Senate in 1964
Adam Walinsky, advisor to President John F. Kennedy

Campaign
Prior to the Democratic primary New York Democratic state chairman John J. Burns met with Representatives Richard Ottinger, Benjamin Stanley Rosenthal, Jonathan Brewster Bingham, and Otis G. Pike in Washington, D.C., in 1969, to discuss plans to prevent party infighting during the 1970 Senate Democratic primary.

On July 12, Paul O'Dwyer, who had received the Democratic nomination for Senate in 1968, announced that he would seek the Democratic senatorial nomination in 1970. O'Dwyer formally announced his candidacy in New York City on December 11, and again in Albany on December 12. However, he was criticized for his refusal to support Hubert Humphrey during the 1968 presidential election. Joseph Zaretski, the Democratic Minority Leader in the state Senate, stated that O'Dwyer was the only candidate with a "tremendous chance of winning the Democratic designation" due to his statewide organization.

On May 12, 1969, Ted Sorensen, who had served as White House Counsel during John F. Kennedy's presidency, stated that prior to Robert F. Kennedy's assassination, he had been asked to run for Kennedy's Senate seat. Sorensen started to campaign for the Democratic senatorial nomination in October.

Representative Richard Ottinger announced on January 19, 1970, that he would be entering the Democratic senatorial primary as the "unity candidate". Ottinger formally announced his candidacy for the Democratic nomination on February 24.

On January 29, Rosenthal announced that he would conduct a statewide tour to test support for a possible senatorial campaign. He promised that he would not cause an irresponsible or destructive primary in a letter written to the state's 300 Democratic committee members. The next day his office stated that Rosenthal was actively campaigning for the Democratic nomination. Although Rosenthal never official announced that he would seek the Democratic nomination he announced on March 4, that he would seek reelection to the House of Representatives as he was unable to find support for a possible senatorial campaign.

On January 12, Representative Richard D. McCarthy stated that he was interested in running for the Democratic nomination for the senate election. On February 27, McCarthy announced that he would seek the Democratic nomination. On April 2, McCarthy dropped out of the Democratic primary to help maintain party unity, but later reentered the primary on April 19, as he felt that Upstate New York would lack representation among the Democratic nominees due to all of the other candidates being from the New York metropolitan area.

On February 23, Morris B. Abram, the president of Brandeis University who had challenged Georgia's voting system in a lawsuit that resulted in the one man, one vote principle being established by the Supreme Court of the United States, announced his resignation from his position so that he could seek the Democratic nomination for senator. However, the Poughkeepsie Board of Elections ruled that Abram was ineligible to run in the Democratic primary as he registered as a member of the Democratic Party on January 26, 1970, meaning that according to New York's election laws he could only run in Democratic primaries after the 1970 general election. The only way that Abram could be granted permission participate in the Democratic primary would be if the New York State Democratic Committee gave 51% approval at its convention on April 1. On March 6, Abram asked the state committee for permission to run, but state chairman John J. Burns stated that a survey of party officials showed little support for him due to his decision to sit out the 1968 presidential election. However, Burns told Abram to conduct a statewide campaign in an attempt to gain support from state committee members. He withdrew from the primary and endorsed Ted Sorensen for the nomination on April 9.

Convention
The 345 member of the Democratic state committee convened in Liberty, New York, from March 31 to April 2, to select the party's nominees. Sorensen received 62% of the delegate vote, making him the designated candidate for the primary, to O'Dwyer's 25%, and Ottinger's 12%. As Sorensen and O'Dwyer were the only candidates to receive more than 25% of the delegate vote they were the only candidates given automatic access onto the primary ballot. All of the other candidates had to petition their way onto the primary ballot with over 10,000 signatures. Ottinger filed petitions with a total of 26,463 signatures and McCarthy filed petitions with a total of 17,080 signatures.

Results
On June 23, the Democratic primary was held in which Ottinger won with over 366,000 votes. O'Dwyer placed second with over 300,000 votes, and performed best within New York City. Sorensen, who was selected as the designated candidate by the state committee, placed a distant third with over 154,000 votes. McCarthy placed last in fourth with over 102,000 votes, and only placed first in his home county, Erie County, and surrounding Cattaraugus and Wyoming counties.

Liberal nomination
The Liberal Party's nomination was electorally important as due to New York's electoral fusion law the party could give its nomination, and a large percentage of the popular vote, to any other party nominee. In the 1968 Senate election incumbent Republican Senator Jacob Javits had defeated Paul O'Dwyer by over one million votes, with half of that total coming from the Liberal Party's ballot line.

On April 4, 1970, the state committee selected Timothy W. Costello to serve as the party's placeholder senatorial candidate. The committee selected placeholder candidates for multiple positions as New York law allowed for parties to replace their nominees within five weeks of selecting them. Due to the selection of Costello, who was serving as Deputy Mayor of New York City, Leon A. Katz, a member of the New York City Council, called for Mayor John Lindsay to fire Costello.

Charles Goodell was favored by officials in the Liberal Party due to criticism levied against him by members of the Republican and Conservative state committees and his opposition to the Vietnam War. Costello also endorsed Goodell before the nomination ballot. On May 11, Goodell received the party's nomination against Paul O'Dwyer, Richard D. McCarthy, Richard Ottinger, and Ted Sorenson.

Prior to the ballot voting O'Dwyer accused the Liberal Party of rigging the ballot in favor of Goodell and stated that his nomination would be a betrayal to liberal voters.

Candidates
Charles Goodell, incumbent United States Senator and former member of United States House of Representatives from New York's 38th congressional district
Richard D. McCarthy, member of United States House of Representatives from New York's 39th congressional district
Paul O'Dwyer, former member of the New York City Council and Democratic nominee in the 1968 Senate election
Richard Ottinger, member of United States House of Representatives from New York's 25th congressional district
Ted Sorensen, 7th White House Counsel

Results

Republican nomination

On March 24, 1970, Charles Goodell announced that he would seek reelection to the United States Senate. During his announcement speech in front of 250 people at the Park Central Hotel Goodell criticized Nixon's civil rights, military spending, and Vietnam policies and Nixon's nomination of G. Harrold Carswell to the Supreme Court of the United States.

James L. Buckley attempted to enter the Republican senatorial primary, but was rejected by the Republican State Committee.

On April 8, the 360 member Republican state committee convened to select the Republican nominees for multiple offices. Goodell faced no opposition during ballot although 49 of the 360 committee members, from Nassau, Suffolk, and Queens counties, chose to abstain rather than to vote for him. The entire 28-member Nassau County delegation abstained due to Goodell's lack of support for Nixon, but chose to not nominate another candidate as that could lead to primary challenges in the state legislator and accusations of not being "real" Republicans. Joseph Margiotta, the Nassau County Chairman, also stated that abstaining would not anger Governor Nelson Rockefeller, who supported Goodell.

Candidates
Charles Goodell, incumbent United States Senator and former member of United States House of Representatives from New York's 38th congressional district

Ineligible
James L. Buckley, Conservative nominee in the 1968 Senate election and brother of William F. Buckley Jr.

Results

Other nominations

Communist

Arnold Johnson, the public relations director of the Communist Party USA, was selected to serve as the Communist Party's senatorial nominee.

Conservation

On July 15, 1970, Richard Ottinger's campaign announced that it would circulate petitions in an attempt to gain another ballot line named the Conservation Party. James L. Buckley criticized the party as an attempt to confuse voters who wished to vote for the Conservative Party. Ottinger's campaign claimed that conservation was chosen for the party's name to reflect Ottinger's support for environmental protection.

In August, Ottinger filed petitions with a total of 33,561 signatures, more than the 12,000 required, to gain the additional ballot line. However, Mason Hampton, the attorney of the Nassau County Conservative Party, filed 24 objections with the board of elections over the Conservation Party and Representative James F. Hastings filed an objection to Secretary of State John P. Lomenzo over the party's name on August 24.

On September 4, Lomenzo ruled that the Conservation Party's name was too similar to the Conservative Party's name and ruled the Conservation Party off of the general election ballot. Ottinger made an appeal to the New York Supreme Court, and on September 17, the state Supreme Court ruled that the Conservation Party could appear on the ballot. However, the Conservative Party made an appeal to the Appellate Division of the state Supreme Court and on October 1, the court ruled in favor of removing the Conservation Party from the general election ballot. Ottinger made an appeal to the New York Court of Appeals, but on October 7, the Court of Appeals ruled four to three to sustain the decision of the appellate court decision.

Independent Alliance

On June 20, 1970, F. Clifton White, James L. Buckley's campaign manager, announced that Buckley's campaign would circulate petitions in an attempt to gain another ballot line named the Independent Alliance Party. Enough valid signatures were collected to gain the additional ballot line, but Secretary of State John P. Lomenzo ruled that the Independent Alliance's emblem, an outline of New York with Buckley's name inside, was illegal as New York's election law limited the number of times that a candidate's name could appear on a ballot line to one. Lomenzo later allowed the party onto the ballot after the emblem was changed to a shield with the letter "I" inside.

Rockefeller, who was running for reelection in the gubernatorial election, and Buckley appeared in the same voting column in New York City due to the ballot design in which Rockefeller's 	Civil Service Independents ballot line was combined with Buckley's Independent Alliance. Although the Independent Alliance Party received over 100,000 votes in the general election, more than the 50,000 votes required to become an official party and automatic ballot access, it did not become an official party as its only candidate was Buckley, who ran in the Senate election and not in the gubernatorial election where the 50,000 votes were required to come from.

Socialist Labor

In April 1970, the Socialist Labor Party of America selected John Emanuel, who had served as the party's nominee in the 1969 New York City mayoral election and as the party's senatorial candidate in 1968, as its senatorial nominee.

Socialist Workers

On January 22, 1970, the Socialist Workers Party selected Kipp Dawson, who was 29 years old, as its senatorial nominee. She had served as a national coordinator of the Student Mobilization Committee to End The War in Vietnam.

General election

On September 14, a debate was held between Buckley, Goodell, and Ottinger at the New York State Publishers Association dinner, with a four-person panel asking questions. During the debate, Goodell and Ottinger stated that the $100,000 bail for the Panther 21 was unconstitutional, and supported the direct election of the president, while Buckley stated that the bail was constitutional and supported the present use of the electoral college to select the president.

A televised debate was held on October 11, between Buckley, Goodell, and Ottinger, by WABC-TV. Goodell and Ottinger gave support to opposition to the Vietnam War, and criticized the foreign policy in Latin America that would lead to "more Vietnams" in Latin America. Buckley gave support to the Vietnam War, and stated that leaving Vietnam would undermine the trust of other small countries in the United States. Another televised debate between the candidates was held on October 18.

On October 30, Stanley Shaw, the Liberal Party leader in Queens County, Paul Siminoff, and Basil Kyriakakis, the Liberal Party leader in Syracuse and Rochester, and New York City Council Minority Leader Eldon R. Clingan called for an emergency meeting of the Liberal Party's state executive committee, to decide whether or not to revoke its nomination from Goodell, and instead give it to Oettinger, to prevent a Buckley victory through vote splitting.

Buckley won the senate election, receiving 2,288,190 votes (38.75%), against Ottinger, receiving 2,171,232 votes (36.77%), and Goodell, receiving 1,434,472 votes (24.29%). Buckley ran for re-election in 1976, but was defeated by Democratic nominee Daniel Patrick Moynihan.

Nixon and Agnew

On June 23, 1970, Charles Goodell stated that he would not support President Richard Nixon during the 1972 presidential election if the United States continued its military involvement in Southeast Asia. On June 24, Goodell stated that he would conduct his campaign without aid from the Nixon administration. He later rejected financial aid from the Nixon administration and the Republican National Committee, even though his campaign was struggling financially.

Goodell lacked support among the Republican base and leadership. On July 1, the Dutchess County Republican Party voted 55 to 21 to not support Goodell, and the Ulster County Republican Party chose to not take a position on the Senate election and told voters to choose for themselves. On July 8, the Franklin County Republican Party voted unanimously to endorse Buckley. On August 25, the Norwich Republican committee endorsed all of the Republican candidates, except for Goodell, as four of the eight committee members chose to abstain.

However, Goodell later stated that he was a better supporter of Nixon than Senators Barry Goldwater and Strom Thurmond, as Goodell supported Nixon in 48% of his votes, compared to Goldwater's 37% support. Goodell also stated that the invasion of Cambodia would be a successful tactical campaign, but that the war would continue to drag on.

Nixon declined to endorse any candidate in New York's senate election. Assistant Press Secretary Gerald Lee Warren stated that Nixon had no position in the election when the New York Times asked Warren if the White House preferred Buckley over Goodell. Goodell stated that Nixon wanted the entire Republican slate to win their elections, and that the only reason he chose not to endorse Goodell was due to him asking Nixon to not do so. Buckley stated that Goodell was attempting to "turn any misfortune of the campaign to his advantage".

Although Nixon declined to take a position in New York's senate election, Vice-president Spiro Agnew did. On September 30, Agnew criticized Goodell for having "left the [Republican] party" and joined the "awful liberal-radical coalition" to obstruct Nixon's policies. It was revealed that Nixon had approved of Agnew's criticism of Goodell before traveling to Europe. Goodell stated that if Nixon wished to remain neutral in the senate election, then he should keep Agnew out of the election as well. Senate Minority Leader Hugh Scott criticized Agnew for his attacks on Goodell, and liberal Republican Senators Jacob Javits, Edward Brooke, and Mark Hatfield also criticized Agnew. Goodell offered to debate Agnew, but Agnew declined, stating that he was "challenged to debates every day". On October 8, Agnew referred to Goodell as the "Christine Jorgensen of the Republican Party", comparing Goodell to the American soldier who had undergone sex re-assignment surgery in the 1950s; Jorgensen later demanded an apology from Agnew, as she did not want her name to be used in "dirty politics".

Results

Endorsements

See also
1970 United States Senate elections

References

New York
1970
United States Senate